Katha magnata is a moth of the family Erebidae. It is found in Taiwan and Guangdong, China.

Subspecies
Katha magnata magnata (Taiwan)
Katha magnata nanlingica Dubatolov, Kishida & Wang, 2012 (China: Guangdong)

References

Moths described in 1927
Lithosiina